Gilbert Kennedy, 2nd Earl of Cassillis (died between 24 and 30 August 1527) was a Scottish nobleman, the son of David Kennedy, 1st Earl of Cassilis and Agnes, daughter of William Borthwick, 3rd Lord Borthwick.

In August 1524 Margaret Tudor sent him to England with Adam Otterburn and Scot of Balwearie to negotiate peace, and a possible marriage for James V with Princess Mary.

He was murdered at Prestwick by the followers of Hew Campbell of Loudon, sheriff of Ayr in August 1527, over a quarrel about the lands of Turnberry.

Marriage and family
He was married to Lady Isabel Campbell, daughter of Archibald Campbell, 2nd Earl Argyll and Elizabeth Stewart. Their children included:
 Janet Kennedy (d. 1566)
 David Kennedy of Culzean
 Gilbert Kennedy, 3rd Earl of Cassilis (born 1515, died 28 November 1558)

References
 G.E. Cokayne; with Vicary Gibbs, H.A. Doubleday, Geoffrey H. White, Duncan Warrand and Lord Howard de Walden, editors, Complete Peerage of England, Scotland, Ireland, Great Britain and the United Kingdom, 13 volumes in 14 (1910–1959; reprint in 6 volumes, Gloucester, U.K.: Alan Sutton Publishing, 2000), vol. 3, p. 74.
 Charles Mosley, editor, Burke's Peerage, Baronetage & Knightage, 107th edition (Wilmington, 2003), volume 1, p. 263; vol. 2 p. 1840.

Gilbert
Earls of Cassilis
Year of birth uncertain
Ambassadors of Scotland to England
People murdered in Scotland
1527 deaths